Dobie may refer to:

Places
 Dobie, Barron County, Wisconsin, an unincorporated community
 Dobie, Douglas County, Wisconsin, an unincorporated community
 Dobie, a place in the township of Gauthier, Ontario, Canada

People and fictional characters
 Dobie (name), a list of people and fictional characters with the surname or given name
 Dobie (musician), stage name of British alternative hip hop musician and producer Anthony Alexander Campbell

Other uses
 Doberman Pinscher or Dobie, a breed of dog
 Dobie High School, Houston, Texas
 Dobie Center, a privately owned residence hall adjacent to the University of Texas at the Austin campus

See also
 Dobby (disambiguation)